Delos Wheeler Lovelace (December 2, 1894 – January 17, 1967) was an American novelist who authored the original novelization of the film King Kong (1933) published in 1932 by Grosset & Dunlap, slightly before the film was released. The story was also serialized in 2 parts in February and March 1933 by Walter Ripperger (credited to Edgar Wallace) for Mystery magazine. Lovelace was a reporter for the New York Daily News and New York Sun in the 1920s.

He authored some two dozen books, including a biography of football coach Knute Rockne and one of Dwight D. Eisenhower. He co-authored three books with his wife.

Personal life
He was the husband of Maud Hart Lovelace, author of the Betsy-Tacy books for young readers; they had one daughter, Merian (January 18, 1931 — September 25, 1997).

Bibliography

Rear Admiral Byrd and the Polar Expedition (1930; published under the pen-name Coram Foster)
Rockne of Notre Dame (1931; biography of Knute Rockne)
King Kong (1933; novelization of the 1933 film King Kong)
One Stayed at Welcome (1934; co-authored with wife Maud Hart Lovelace)
Gentlemen from England (1937; co-authored with wife Maud Hart Lovelace)
The golden wedge: Indian legends of South America (1942; co-authored with wife Maud Hart Lovelace)
General "Ike" Eisenhower (1944; biography of Dwight D. Eisenhower)
Journey to Bethlehem  (1953)
That Dodger Horse (1956; sometimes "The Dodger Horse")

Short Stories:
Auction (with Maud Hart Lovelace), (ss) The Country Gentleman Aug 2 1924
Barley Straw, (ss) The Country Gentleman Aug 23 1924
Big Bite, (ss) The Country Gentleman Feb 1926
Bonanza, (ss) The Country Gentleman Jul 1926
Boot, (ss) The Country Gentleman May 2, 1925
Borghild’s Clothes (with Maud Hart Lovelace), (ss) The Modern Priscilla Apr 1922
Carmelita, Widow (with Maud Hart Lovelace), (ss) Catholic World Oct 1924
Country Fair, (ss) The Country Gentleman May 1926
Country Queer, (ss) The Country Gentleman May 2, 1925
Cutting Edge, (ss) The Country Gentleman Apr 11 1925
Danny, (ss) The Country Gentleman Jul 11 1925
Detour No. 1, (ss) The Country Gentleman Mar 1928
Dishpan, (ss) The Country Gentleman Sep 1927
East Wind (with Maud Hart Lovelace), (ss) The Country Gentleman Apr 26 1924
Fiddlefoot, (ss) The Saturday Evening Post Jul 18 1925
Fussbudget, (ss) The American Magazine Feb 1928
Gimme Gal, (ss) Success Jul 1927
Good Ideal, (ss) The Country Gentleman Aug 22 1925
Good Provider, (ss) The Country Gentleman May 1929
Inheritance, (ss) The Country Gentleman Dec 20 1924
Kitchen View, (ss) The Country Gentleman May 1927
Land (with Maud Hart Lovelace), (ss) Liberty Aug 9 1924
Laughing Tyrant (with Maud Hart Lovelace), (ss) The Country Gentleman Mar 29 1924
Little of Both,A, (ss) The Popular Magazine Sep 20 1925
Lucky Year, (ss) The Country Gentleman Feb 7 1925
Maid and the Hope Chest, The (with Maud Hart Lovelace), (ss) Metropolitan Magazine May 1924Neighbors (with Maud Hart Lovelace), (ss) The Country Gentleman Sep 27 1924Old Chris Pedersen, (ss) The Country Gentleman Dec 1925One Day to Live (with Maud Hart Lovelace), (ss) The Delineator Oct 1925Proud Old Rooster, (ss) The American Magazine Mar 1928Pull-Away, (ss) The Country Gentleman Mar 28 1925Sleeping Cold, (ss) The Saturday Evening Post Feb 25 1928Sold, (ss) The Country Gentleman Aug 1 1925Stubborn Stebbins, (ss) The Country Gentleman Nov 1928Swap, (ss) The Country Gentleman May 23, 1925Toe of the Stocking, (ss) The Country Gentleman Dec 1926Venture, (ss) Liberty May 1, 1926Wheat, (ss) Ladies Home Journal Jul 1924Whip Hand, (ss) The Country Gentleman Jun 13 1925Yes, Ma’am!'', (ss) The Country Gentleman May 1928

References

External links

Papers of Delos W. Lovelace regarding General "Ike" Eisenhower, 1944, Dwight D. Eisenhower Presidential Library

20th-century American novelists
American male novelists
1894 births
1967 deaths
20th-century American biographers
People from Brainerd, Minnesota
20th-century American male writers
American male biographers